The 1942 Delaware Fightin' Blue Hens football team was an American football team that represented the University of Delaware in the 1942 college football season. In its third season under head coach William D. Murray, the team compiled an 8–0 record, shut out five of eight opponents, and outscored all opponents by a total of 196 to 28.

Schedule

References

Delaware
Delaware Fightin' Blue Hens football seasons
College football undefeated seasons
Delaware Fightin' Blue Hens football